Speothalpius grayi is a species of beetle in the family Carabidae, the only species in the genus Speothalpius.

References

Dryptinae